Phyllonorycter holodisci is a species of moth in the family Gracillariidae. This species is known from California, United States.

The larvae feed on the leaves of the shrub Holodiscus discolor. The larvae mine the leaves of their host plant. The mine is located on the upper side of the leaf.

References

holodisci
Moths of North America

Lepidoptera of the United States
Leaf miners
Moths described in 1939
Taxa named by Annette Frances Braun